Der Vampyr (The Vampire) is an opera (designated as a Romantische Oper) in three acts by Peter Josef von Lindpaintner. The German libretto by Cäsar Max Hegel was based on a work by Heinrich Ludwig Ritter, based in turn on a French melodrama by Charles Nodier, Pierre Carmouche and Achille de Jouffroy, ultimately traceable to the short story "The Vampyre" (1819) by John William Polidori, although Lindpaintner's libretto credits, erroneously, Lord Byron.

Other early 19th-century operas on the same theme were Silvestro de Palma's I vampiri (1812), Martin-Joseph Mengal's Le vampire (1826), and Heinrich Marschner's Der Vampyr of the same year as Lindpaintner's opera (1828).

Performance history
It proved the most successful of the composer's operas.

Lindpaintner made a revised version of the opera in 1850, when he put recitatives in the place of the original spoken dialogue.

Roles

Synopsis
The scene of the action is in the south of France (not Scotland), though in general it follows the same story as Marschner's Der Vampyr.

References

Further reading
Brown, Clive (1992), 'Vampyr, Der' in The New Grove Dictionary of Opera, ed. Stanley Sadie (London)

External links

Libretto, Wikimedia Commons

Operas
Operas by Peter Josef von Lindpaintner
Romantische Opern
German-language operas
1828 operas
Operas set in France
Vampires in music
Operas based on literature
Adaptations of works by Charles Nodier